This list is about incidents of civil unrest, rioting, violent labor disputes, or minor insurrections or revolts in Chicago, Illinois.

19th century

20th century

1900–1949

1950–1999

21st century

See also
 Chicago shooting
 List of incidents of civil unrest in the United States
 Lists of Incidents of unrest and violence in the United States by city
 List of riots (notable incidents of civil disorder worldwide)
 List of strikes

References

 
Incidents of civil unrest in Chicago
Chicago-related lists
History of Chicago